The 2014 NEAFL season was the fourth season of the North East Australian Football League (NEAFL). The season began on Saturday, 29 March and concluded on Saturday, 13 September with the NEAFL Grand Final.

 were the premiers for the season after they defeated the Sydney Swans reserves by two points in the Grand Final due to a goal kicked moments before final siren.

League structure
For the first time since the NEAFL's inception in November 2010, a major restructure of the league occurred ahead of the 2014 season. The total number of clubs in the competition was reduced from 19 to 14, with Tuggeranong (ACT), Broadbeach (QLD), Labrador (QLD), Morningside (QLD) and Mt Gravatt (QLD) all having their licenses revoked.

The conference system which resulted in clubs being geographically split into either an Eastern (NSW/ACT) or Northern (QLD/NT) conference was abolished and was replaced by a single competition ladder structure, ensuring the top 6 teams at the end of the home and away season would progress to a finals series.

Although North Queensland is considered to be a strategic area for future AFL expansion, NEAFL executives elected not to base a team in the region for the 2014 season.

Participating clubs

Premiership season
Source: NEAFL season 2014 results and fixtures

Round 1

Round 2

Round 3

Round 4

Round 5

Round 6

Round 7

Round 8

Round 9

Round 10

Round 11

Round 12

Round 13

Round 14

Round 15

Round 16

Round 17

Round 18

Round 19

Round 20

Round 21

Ladder

Finals series

Elimination finals

Preliminary finals

Grand Final

Foxtel Cup

Both teams were knocked out in the Qualifying/First Round stage of the competition. Their results are shown below:

State games
The top-level players from the NEAFL partook in two state games in season 2014, one against the West Australian Football League representative team on 24 May and another against the Tasmanian State League representative team on 21 June.

Awards

Team of the Year

Best and fairest winners

AFL draftees

N – national draft 
R – rookie draft

References

External links
http://www.neafl.com.au/ Official NEAFL website

Australian rules football competition seasons
NEAFL